Roei Yellin (born September 11, 1981) is an Israeli sprint canoer who competed in the early to mid-2000s. Competing in the 2000 Summer Olympics in Sydney and the 2004 Summer Olympics in Athens, he earned his best finish of ninth in the K-1 1000 m event at Athens.

Yellin is Jewish.

References

External links
 

1981 births
Canoeists at the 2000 Summer Olympics
Canoeists at the 2004 Summer Olympics
Israeli male canoeists
Living people
Olympic canoeists of Israel
Israeli people of Romanian-Jewish descent